Stigmaulax cancellatus is a species of predatory sea snail, a marine gastropod mollusk in the family Naticidae, the moon snails.

Distribution
Found in the Caribbean

Description 
The maximum recorded shell length is 24 mm.

Habitat 
Minimum recorded depth is 0 m. Maximum recorded depth is 70 m.

References

External links
 

Naticidae
Taxa named by Johann Hermann
Gastropods described in 1781